A gongoozler is a person who enjoys watching activity on the canals of the United Kingdom. The term is also used more generally to describe those who harbour an interest in canals and canal life, but do not actively participate.

Etymology
"Gongoozler" may have been canal workers' slang for an observer standing apparently idle on the towpath. Though it was used derisively in the past, today the term is regularly used, perhaps with a little irony, by gongoozlers to describe themselves and their hobby.

The word may have arisen from words in Lincolnshire dialect: gawn and gooze, both meaning to stare or gape. It might be presumed that such an expression would date from the nineteenth century, when canals were at their peak, but the word is only recorded from the end of that century or the early twentieth. It was given wider use by the late L. T. C. Rolt, who used it in his book about canal life, Narrow Boat, in 1944. A gawn is also a small ship of lading, such as a working-narrowboat.

The term "gongoozler" may also be used in any circumstance in which people are spectating without contributing to either the content or interest of an event.

Aspects of gongoozling

Gongoozling, much like trainspotting, is a hobby that can extend to all aspects of canals.

Canal artwork
The collection or creation of canal-related artwork is a common pastime amongst gongoozlers. This includes paintings, postcards and photographs.

Canal locks
Canal locks often attract spectators, including gongoozlers, because the operation of manual canal locks is a complex affair, with a number of opportunities for mistakes to be made. Some observers have been known to heckle or harass the boat crews, whilst others carry a lock windlass and actively wish to help boat crews with their passage, by opening the paddles, or helping push open the heavy balance beams on the gates.

Canal history and technology
Whilst trainspotting is commonly associated with identifying engine makes, it is rare for Gongoozlers to do likewise. However an interest can occur for the history of a section of canal, or the operation of locks and alternative devices such as inclined planes, water slopes, and boat lifts with types like the Anderton boat lift, the Falkirk Wheel and the Strépy-Thieu boat lift.

Notable locations

Staircase locks, which can hold many boats at once, are very popular amongst gongoozlers, making Foxton Locks on the Leicester Line of the Grand Union Canal an ideal location for gongoozling. A similar steep incline on the Kennet and Avon Canal near Devizes, Caen Hill Locks, is also very popular with tourists and sightseers.

Fradley Junction in Staffordshire is a popular place to observe canal traffic, as are many other junctions like Saul, due to the occasional need for three boats to pass.

The Falkirk Wheel, near Falkirk in Scotland, which connects the Forth and Clyde Canal with the Union Canal, is a huge and spectacular feat of engineering, and attracts very large numbers of gongoozlers.

Some locations have become known for their gongoozlers thanks to local events that encourage an increased number of observers. Princess Street lock on the Rochdale Canal in Manchester city centre is normally quite quiet, but it becomes a popular attraction during the Manchester Mardi Gras (which is actually held in late August).

The eight locks of Fonserannes on the Canal du Midi in Southern France attract so many gongoozlers that they have become the third most popular tourist attraction in Languedoc.

See also

Aircraft spotting
Birdwatching
Bus spotting
Kibitzing
Trainspotting
Umarell

References

Observation hobbies
Canals in the United Kingdom